Singrauli Coalfield is spread across the districts of Singrauli and Sonebhadra in the Indian states of Madhya Pradesh and Uttar Pradesh, mostly in the basin of the Son River.

The Coalfield
The north-eastern part of the coalfield sits on a plateau with an altitude of 500m above mean sea level, well above the lower plains of 280m altitude.
 
Important coal seams in this part of Singrauli coalfield are: Jhingurda (130–162 m thick), Purewa (8–25 m thick) and Turra (12–22 m thick). Qualitatively, the products of these seams are generally high moisture (6-9 per cent) and high ash (17-40 per cent) coals. The volatile matter ranges from 25-30 per cent. The calorific value of the coal varies from 4,200-5,900 Kcal/kg.

Almost all of India’s coal reserves are of Gondwana coal. Thickness of coal seams in Indian coalfields generally range from 1 m to 30 m. An exceptionally thick seam of 138 m has been discovered in Singrauli coalfield.

Operations
Singrauli Coalfield is divided into two parts by the Kachni River - Moher sub-basin and Singrauli main basin. Major part of the Moher sub-basin lies in the Singrauli district of Madhya Pradesh and a small part lies in the Sonebhadra district of Uttar Pradesh. Singrauli main basin lies in the western and southern parts of the coalfield and is largely unexplored. The present coal mining activities and future blocks are concentrated in Moher sub-basin.

Although some sporadic mining by private companies took place from early days, large scale and systematic mining was initiated in the Moher sub-basin by NCDC in the early sixties. A master plan for the Moher basin was prepared by the P&D Division of NCDC, in consultation with Soviet experts. The master plan envisaged large mechanized open cast mines.

Northern Coalfields Limited was carved out of Central Coalfields Limited in 1986, to take care of operations in the Singrauli Coalfield. During 2010-11, coal production of Northern Coalfield Limited was 66.253 million tonnes.

Power plants
Most of the coal produced from Northern Coalfields Limited is dispatched to pithead power plants. Some of the power plants in the area are:Singrauli Super Thermal Power Station, Rihand Thermal Power Station, Anpara Thermal Power Station, Obra Thermal Power Station, Vindhyachal Thermal Power Station and Renusagar Thermal Power Plant.

References

Recruitment 

 Official Updates
 Northern Coalfields Ltd Recruitment 2020 - 

Coalfields of India
Energy in Madhya Pradesh
Energy in Uttar Pradesh
Singrauli district
Sonbhadra district
Mining in Madhya Pradesh
Mining in Uttar Pradesh